Blairsville is an unincorporated community in York County, in the U.S. state of South Carolina.

History
The community was named after the local Blair family. A post office called Blairsville was established in 1815, and remained in operation until 1903.

References

Unincorporated communities in South Carolina
Unincorporated communities in York County, South Carolina